Rutland Township is one of twelve townships in Humboldt County, Iowa, USA. As of the 2000 census, its population was 529.

History
Rutland Township was organized in 1867.

Geography

Cities, towns, villages
Rutland

Adjacent townships
 Delana Township (north)
 Humboldt Township (northeast)
 Grove Township (east)
 Beaver Township (southeast)
 Corinth Township (south)
 Weaver Township (southwest)
 Avery Township (west)
 Wacousta Township (northwest)

Cemeteries
The township contains Rutland Township Cemetery.

Political districts
 Iowa's 4th congressional district
 State House District 4

References
 United States Census Bureau 2008 TIGER/Line Shapefiles
 United States Board on Geographic Names (GNIS)
 United States National Atlas

External links
 US-Counties.com
 City-Data.com

Townships in Humboldt County, Iowa
Populated places established in 1867
Townships in Iowa